(), commonly referred to as , is an amusement park in Lyngby-Taarbæk Kommune, Denmark, near Klampenborg (Gentofte municipality), about  north of central Copenhagen.

With 2.5–2.9 million visitors per year, it is the second most popular attraction in Denmark, after the more widely known Tivoli Gardens amusement park. Unlike Tivoli, admission is free.

History

The origins of Dyrehavsbakken can be traced back to 1583 when Kirsten Piil discovered a natural spring in what is now known as Jægersborg Dyrehave or Dyrehaven, a large forest park north of Copenhagen. Residents of Copenhagen were attracted to the spring water due to the poor water quality in central Copenhagen during this period. Many believed the natural spring to have curative properties, and therefore Piil's discovery drew large crowds, especially in the springtime. These large crowds attracted entertainers and hawkers, whose presence are the origins of the amusement park today.

For a period the area that the spring was located on, was not open to the public due to it being on royal hunting grounds. In 1669, King Frederick III decided to set up an animal park in the area and his son, Christian V, extended the size of the park by 3-4 times after he became king in 1670. The area was named Jægersborg Dyrehave, its present name, in 1671. The park was off-limits to the general public under Christian V and this did not change until 1756, under Frederick V.

Open to the general public once again, Dyrehavsbakken began to flourish. The entertainers, hawkers, and innkeepers returned to the area, and Bakken's growing reputation throughout Europe attracted other entertainers and artists, including Pjerrot, the clown who still is a fixture at the park today. Bakken continued to grow even throughout the Napoleonic Wars. Its popularity was later aided by easier accessibility due to the development of steamships (1820) and railroads (1864), as well as good publicity from poets and authors.

As the popularity of Bakken grew, its conditions worsened. As a result, some of the business owners, or "tent owners" as they are still called today, created the Dyrehavsbakken Tent Owners’ Association of 1885. The association improved garbage collection, restroom facilities, water supply, publicity, and helped bring electricity to the park. The association is still around today, and all businesses operating in the park are required to join.

The entertainment options also improved over time. Cabarets such as Sansouci, which opened in 1866, and Bakkens Hvile, which opened in 1877, became increasingly popular. The 20th century brought other popular ventures, such as the Circus Revue and automated moving rides. Over time, more modern rides and entertainment options have been introduced.

Rides

Bakken may have started as a place to get clean spring water, but today it is a thriving amusement park filled with modern rides and amenities. Bakken is home to five roller coasters, the most famous of which is Rutschebanen (Danish for "The Roller Coaster"), a wooden roller coaster open since 1932. Rutschebanen was deemed a Coaster Classic by the American Coaster Enthusiasts until the end of the 2009 season, after which the trains were renewed and the brakemen who rode along to control the speed were retired, thus rescinding the Classic status. The park is also home to dozens of other amusements and smaller rides suited for all ages.

Roller coasters

Other rides
Each of the rides requires a certain number of coupons.
Afro Cups - spinning cups (4 coupons).
Bumper Cars - bumper cars (5 coupons)
Crazy Theater - indoor laser shoot-out (6 coupons).
Græshoppen - a KMG Move It 24, installed for the 2021 season.
Enterprise - enterprise spinner (5 coupons).
Extreme - giant swing (6 coupons).
5D Cinema - shows 4 different movies, each about 10 – 12 minutes long (8 coupons).
Ghost Train - indoor ghost train (5 coupons).
Hullabaloo - funny house (4 coupons).
Jungle Boats - boats and water shooting (4 coupons).
Polyp - polyp spinner (5 coupons).
Rodeobanen - on track go carts.
Safari - dark ride laser shoot out (5 coupons).
Samba Tower - air carousel (4 coupons).
Spinning Car - hovercraft ride (4 coupons).
SRV - simulator ride (4 coupons).
Swan Station - aerial swan ride.
Tidsmaskinen - a Zamperla NebulaZ, installed for the 2021 season.
Tower Thrill - a 30m tall drop tower (6 coupons).
Water Cannon - water shoot out on boats (5 coupons).
Viking Ship Dragon - swinging Viking ship (5 coupons).
Water Slide - a log flume ride. Travels a 390 m long course and has two drops on the way (5 coupons).

Kiddie rides
Bin Express - roundabout (4 coupons).
Børne Ferris Wheel - mini Ferris wheel (4 coupons).
Carousel - children's carousel (3 coupons).
Hip Hop - mini drop tower (4 coupons).
Jeep - on track jeep ride (3 coupons).
Klatrejungle - challenge course.
Little Trains mini train ride (4 coupons).
Mini Dumpo - circular ride (3 coupons).
Santa's Obstacle Course - play area.

Shows
Bakkens Hvile - cabaret show.
Circus Revue - revue show from 19 May to 27 August.
Pjerrot the Clown - the park's mascot entertains the kids.
Bakken Animals - animal show.

Former Attractions

Other attractions
Bakken contains many other entertainment options in addition to rides. This includes seven different gaming halls that have carnival-style games, slot machines, and dancing. The park's mascot, Pjerrot the clown, performs every day for young children. The park is also home to Bakkens Hvile music hall, where cabarets are common, as well as the Circus Revue, a live circus-style performance. There are also live music performances in lounges and bars across the park on a regular basis.

The park is home to dozens of restaurants of all tastes and price ranges. The style of the restaurants ranges from standard amusement park street food vendors, to buffets, to fancier wine-and-dine restaurants. The type of food represented ranges from standard amusement park fare, such as hamburgers and cotton candy, to traditional Danish cuisine, such as Pølser (Danish hot dogs), Æbleskiver (Danish popovers), and Smørrebrød (open-faced sandwiches), to many other types of international cuisine. Bakken also contains numerous bars and lounges, where popular Danish beer such as Carlsberg and Tuborg are served.

Operation
Bakken is open daily from the end of March through the end of August. Entrance into the park area is free of charge, but rides and attractions require payment. Prices depend on the ride or attraction. Discounted coupons, wristbands, and season passes can also be purchased.

Gallery

See also
 Tourism in Denmark

References

External links
 Bakken website 
 Bakken website 
 Review of Bakken
 Roller Coaster DataBase: Bakken

1583 establishments in Europe
Amusement parks in Denmark
Tourist attractions in the Capital Region of Denmark
Danish culture
Buildings and structures in Lyngby-Taarbæk Municipality
16th-century establishments in Denmark